The Lynk & Co 08 is a compact crossover SUV produced by Geely and marketed under the Lynk & Co brand.

History 
The 08 was previewed by the Lynk & Co The Next Day concept car presented in China on 7 June 2022, announcing the next line of new models. The 08 is scheduled to be presented on 30 March 2023 in China.

Specifications 
The 08 SUV is based on the CMA (Compact Modular Architecture) platform, and it is the technical twin of the third generation Volvo XC60, which is produced by Volvo Cars.

References

08
Crossover sport utility vehicles
Compact sport utility vehicles
Cars introduced in 2023
Front-wheel-drive vehicles